Otto is a masculine German given name and a surname. It originates as an Old High German short form (variants Audo, Odo, Udo) of Germanic names beginning in aud-, an element meaning "wealth, prosperity".

The name is recorded from the 7th century (Odo, son of Uro, courtier of Sigebert III). It was the name of three 10th-century German kings, the first of whom was Otto I the Great, the first Holy Roman Emperor, founder of the Ottonian dynasty.

The Gothic form of the prefix was auda- (as in e.g. Audaþius), the Anglo-Saxon form was ead- (as in e.g. Eadmund), and the Old Norse form was auð-.

The given name Otis arose from an English surname, which was in turn derived from Ode, a variant form of Odo, Otto.

Due to Otto von Bismarck, the given name Otto was strongly associated with the German Empire in the later 19th century.

People called Otto

Medieval 
 Otto (mayor of the palace) (died 643 or 644), mayor of the palace of Austrasia briefly in the mid-7th century
 Otto I, Duke of Saxony (851–912)
 the Ottonian dynasty
 Otto I, Holy Roman Emperor (912–973)
 Otto II, Holy Roman Emperor (955–983)
 Otto III, Holy Roman Emperor (980–1002)
 Otto IV, Holy Roman Emperor (1175/1176–1218)
 Otto of Bamberg (1060/1061–1139), bishop and Catholic saint
 Otto of Freising (c. 1114–1158), bishop and chronicler

Modern 
 Otto of Greece (1815–1867), King of Greece
 Otto Barić (1933–2020), Croatian footballer and manager
 Otto, King of Bavaria (1848–1916), King of Bavaria
 Otto Adler, president of the Jewish Association of Romania
 Otto T. Bannard (1854–1929), American attorney, businessman and philanthropist
 Otto Carius (1922–2015), German tank ace and pharmacist
 Otto Diels (1876–1954), German chemist 
 Otto Dix (1891–1969), German painter and printmaker
 Otto Dowling (1881–1946), 25th Governor of American Samoa
 Otto Farrant, British actor
 Otto Fischer (footballer) (1901–1941), Austrian (soccer) football player and coach
 Otto Förschner (1902–1946), German Nazi SS concentration camp commandant; executed for war crimes
 Otto Frank (1889–1980), German-born Swiss business man, father of Anne Frank
 Otto Freundlich (1878–1943), German painter and sculptor
 Otto Graham (1921–2003), professional American football and basketball player
 Otto Graf Lambsdorff (1926–2009), German politician
 Otto Grotewohl (1894–1964), East German politician
 Otto Hahn (1879–1968), German chemist
 Otto Herschmann (1877–1942), Austrian Olympic fencing and swimming medalist
 Otto Hindrich (2002-), Romanian Footballer
 Otto Klemperer (1885–1973), German-born conductor and composer
 Otto Knows (born 1989), Swedish DJ
 Otto Koivula (born 1998), Finnish ice hockey player
 Otto Kraushaar(1901–1989), American academic
 Otto Kretschmer (1912–1998), German World War II U-boat captain
 Otto Lietchen (1887–1977), American politician
 Otto Lilienthal (1848–1896), German aviator
 Otto Ludvig Beckman (1856–1909), Swedish Coastal Artillery major general
 Otto Lybeck (1871–1947), Swedish Navy admiral
 Otto Mahler (1873–1895), Bohemian-Austrian composer, brother of Gustav
 Otto Mears (1840–1931), Russian-American road and railway builder
 Otto Moll (1915–1946), German SS-Hauptscharführer at Auschwitz concentration camp; executed for war crimes
 Otto Ohlendorf (1907–1951), German SS general and Holocaust perpetrator; executed for war crimes
 Otto Peterson (1960–2014), American comedian (Otto & George ventriloquism act)
 Otto Porter (born 1993), American professional basketball player for the Washington Wizards, NBA
 Otto Planetta (1899–1934), Austrian Nazi Waffen-SS who murdered Austrian Chancellor Engelbert Dollfuss
 Otto Plath (1885–1940), father of American poet Sylvia Plath, and entomologist
 Otto Pohla (1899–1941), Estonian wrestler
 Otto Preminger (1905–1986), Austro–Hungarian-born American film director
 Otto Rehhagel (born 1938), German football coach
 Otto Sigfrid Reuter (1876–1945), German völkisch-religious ideologue
 Otto Sauter-Sarto (1884–1958), German actor
 Otto Scheff (1889–1956), Austrian Olympic swimming champion
 Otto Schily (born 1932), German politician 
 Otto Schmitt (field hockey) (born 1965), Argentine field hockey goalkeeper
 Otto Skorzeny (1908–1975), Austrian-born Waffen-SS commando
 Otto Sohn-Rethel (1877–1949), German painter and lepidopterist.
 Otto Soglow (1900–1975), American cartoonist
 Otto Strandman (1875–1941), Estonian politician, former Prime Minister
 Otto Tief (1889–1976), Estonian politician, military commander, lawyer, former Prime Minister
 Otto van Verschuer (1927–2014), Dutch politician
 Otto Christian Archibald von Bismarck (1897–1975), German politician and diplomat
 Otto von Bismarck (1815–1898), Prussian/German statesman
 Otto von Habsburg (1912–2011), head of the House of Habsburg-Lorraine from 1922 to 2007
 Otto Waalkes (born 1948), German comedian and actor
 Otto Wagner (1841–1918), Austrian architect
 Otto Wahle (1879–1963), Austrian-born American Olympic swimming medalist and Hall of Fame
 Otto F. Walter (1928–1994), Swiss journalist, author and publisher
 Otto Warmbier (1994–2017), American student imprisoned in North Korea
 Otto Weininger (1880–1903), Christian Austrian philosopher 
 Otto Maximiliano Pereira de Cordeiro Ferreira (born 1968), Brazilian singer-songwriter, drummer and TV presenter
 Otto Wichterle (1913–1998), Czech chemist, best known for his invention of modern soft contact lenses
 Otto S. Wolfbeis (born 1947), professor of analytical chemistry and interface chemistry at the University of Regensburg

Fictional entities
 Otto Delaney, a character in the drama Sons of Anarchy on the American TV network FX, played by series creator Kurt Sutter
 Herr Otto Flick, a character in the BBC sitcom 'Allo 'Allo!
 Otto Hightower, Hand of the King to Viserys Targaryen in HBO series House of the Dragon
 Otto Maddox, the main character in the 1984 film Repo Man
 Otto Malpense, the main character in the H.I.V.E. series by Mark Walden
 Otto Mann, character on the animated TV series The Simpsons
 Otto Octavius, fictional Marvel Comics supervillain otherwise known as Doctor Octopus. One of Spider-Man's nemeses
 Jake, Jeremiah, and Troy Otto, character on Fear the Walking Dead, Season 3
 Oswald "Otto" Rocket, the main character of Nickelodeon's Rocket Power
 Otto Osworth, the main character of Cartoon Network's Time Squad
 Otto Suwen, a character in the anime/manga series Re:Zero − Starting Life in Another World
 Otto, the inflatable "auto" pilot in the 1980 comedy film Airplane!
 Otto West, the main antagonist in the 1988 heist comedy A Fish Called Wanda
 Otto, one of the main Minions in the 2022 computer-animated comedy film Minions: The Rise of Gru
 Ottoriki, one of the main characters in American animated children's television series GoGoRiki.

Animals
 Otto (dog) (1989–2010), world's oldest dog
 Otocinclus, Sucking catfish, often known as 'Otto'

See also
 Otto (disambiguation)
 Oto (name)
 Auðr (disambiguation)
 Ēðel

References

External links

 AUD, Name List: Auð- (nordicnames.de)

Danish masculine given names
Dutch masculine given names
English masculine given names
Estonian masculine given names
Finnish masculine given names
German masculine given names
Icelandic masculine given names
Masculine given names
Norwegian masculine given names
Swedish masculine given names